Letter is a railway station located in Letter, Germany. The station is located on the Hanover–Minden railway and the Bremen–Hanover railway. The train services are operated by Deutsche Bahn as part of the Hanover S-Bahn. Letter is served by the S1 and S2. It is in the Umland zone of Hannover.

Train services
The following services currently call at Letter:

References

Railway stations in Lower Saxony
Hannover S-Bahn stations